The Elizabeth L. Scott Award is an biennial award given (in even years) by the Committee of Presidents of Statistical Societies and named in honor of Elizabeth Scott, an American statistician.  This award recognizes an individual who exemplifies the contributions of Elizabeth L. Scott’s lifelong efforts to further the careers of women in academia.  The award is given to an individual who has helped foster opportunities in statistics for women and is presented at the Joint Statistical Meetings.  Starting in 2020, the recipient of the award will give a lecture at the Joint Statistical Meetings.

List of Award winners

See also

 List of mathematics awards

References  

Statistical awards